Ufo is a genus of gall wasps in the tribe Synergini, first discovered in Japan. Its genus name Ufo comes from the common phrase "unidentified flying object", in this case applied because the researchers did not know what the wasp was when they first saw it.

Genera 
Four species are currently classified within Ufo.

U. abei (Melika et al. 2005)
U. cerroneuroteri (Melika et al. 2012)
U. koreanus (Melika et al. 2007)
U. nipponicus (Melika et al. 2012)

Saphonecrus shirakashii and S. shirokashicola were formerly placed in Ufo, but further research indicated they were better placed in Saphonecrus.

References

Cynipidae